The International Boxing Organization (IBO) is a US based corporation that sanctions professional boxing matches and awards world and regional championships. 

It is an independent and well-known organization not recognized by the "big four" governing bodies (WBA, WBC, IBF and WBO), who only recognize each other in their rankings and title unification rules. 

It is recognized as a legitimate world championship by the British Boxing Board of Control, the European Boxing Union, BoxRec, and BoxingScene but is unrecognized as such by The Ring magazine.

History 
The IBO was founded in 1988 and incorporated in Illinois in 1992 by John W. Daddono. The organization was later moved to Florida in 1997 and incorporated in Florida at that time. Ed Levine, who continues to serve as the organization's President became a partner and President of the IBO at that time.

The organization received acclaim by implementing a computerized system 'The Independent World Boxing Rankings' in the late 1990s that removed subjective elements from the ratings in an effort to bring more credibility to the sport. From 2014 the organization now employs Boxrec, the independent boxing records keeper and computerized rankings website to produce IBO's rankings. Many marquee champions have held and continue to hold the International Boxing Organization World title.

The IBO permits only one world champion per weight division. "We have never had more than one champion per weight division nor will we", according to its president Ed Levine.

In addition to world champions, IBO recognizes regional champions, including the Inter-Continental champion. If an IBO Inter-Continental champion successfully defends his title three times, he may receive a mandatory opportunity for the world title.

Notable past IBO champions 

Thomas Hearns, former Cruiserweight champion
Lennox Lewis, former Heavyweight champion
James Toney, former Cruiserweight champion
Wladimir Klitschko, former Heavyweight champion
Roy Jones Jr., former Light Heavyweight champion
Marco Antonio Barrera, former Featherweight champion
Naseem Hamed, former Featherweight champion
Floyd Mayweather Jr., former Welterweight champion
Ricky Hatton, former Light Welterweight champion
Manny Pacquiao, former Light Welterweight champion
Bernard Hopkins, former Light Heavyweight champion
Nonito Donaire, former Flyweight champion
Sergio Martínez, former Super Welterweight champion
Andy Ruiz Jr., former Heavyweight champion
Tyson Fury, former Heavyweight champion
Anthony Joshua, former Heavyweight champion

Current IBO world title holders
As of June 2022

Male

Female

See also 
List of IBO world champions
List of WIBO world champions

References

External links

 
Professional boxing organizations
International sports organizations
Sports organizations established in 1988